Trichromy is the colour theory by which any colour can be reproduced solely combining the three primary colours. It relies on human trichromacy.

It is also referred to the three colour process in photography. French histories of photography have claimed that Charles Cros and Ducos du Hauron simultaneously invented its application to photography around 1868, though English histories of photography have claimed that it was first suggested by J. C. Maxwell and defectively demonstrated with the help of by Thomas Sutton in 1861 (according to Maxwell himself, Sutton's widespread photochemistry wasn't sensitive enough to red and green light).

Notes 

Science of photography
History of photography